Usama Siala is a Libyan politician who served as the Minister of Communications and Information Technology from January 2013 to August 2014. The cabinet was selected by Prime Minister Ali Zeidan on 30 October 2012 and was approved by the General National Congress on 31 October 2012. Siala's term as Minister of Communications and Information Technology ended when the cabinet resigned on 29 August 2014. He was then reinstated as President of General Telecommunications and Information Authority on 22/09/2014.

Education
Siala graduated from Tripoli University with a b.sc. in telecommunication in 1999.

Career
OCT 2014–present day
President of General Telecommunications and Information Authority

NOV 2012–present day
Head of General Assembly of LPTIC

OCT 2014–present day
Board member of the Libyan Investment Authority board of directors

MAR 2015–present day
Libyan African Investment Portfolio
Board member of the Libyan African Investment Portfolio board of directors

NOV 2012–OCT 2014
Libyan government
Minister of Communications and Informatics

Views
Usama Siala is a strong supporter of privatization of the telecom sector of Libya and would like to see the government decrease its hold on the telecommunications sector and get the private sector more involved.

References

External links 
 Ministry of Communications and Information Technology 
 Libyan Telecommunication Holding company

Government ministers of Libya
Living people
Members of the Interim Government of Libya
1970 births
People of the First Libyan Civil War
Libyan engineers